Nanos is a genus of scarab beetles in the tribe Deltochilini.

Species 
 Nanos agaboides
 Nanos andreiae
 Nanos ankaranae
 Nanos antsalovaensis
 Nanos antsihanakensis
 Nanos ater
 Nanos bemarahaensis
 Nanos bicoloratus
 Nanos bimaculatus
 Nanos binotatus
 Nanos clypeatus
 Nanos constricticollis
 Nanos dubitatus
 Nanos fusconitens
 Nanos hanskii
 Nanos humbloti
 Nanos humeralis
 Nanos incertus
 Nanos magnus
 Nanos manomboensis
 Nanos manongorivoensis
 Nanos marojejyensis
 Nanos minutus
 Nanos mirjae
 Nanos mixtus
 Nanos nitens
 Nanos occidentalis
 Nanos peyrierasi
 Nanos pseudofusconitens
 Nanos pseudominutus
 Nanos pseudorubromaculatus
 Nanos pseudoviettei
 Nanos punctatus
 Nanos pygmaeus
 Nanos ranomafanaensis
 Nanos rubromaculatus
 Nanos rubrosignatus
 Nanos semicribrosus
 Nanos sinuatipes
 Nanos vadoni
 Nanos viettei
 Nanos viridissimus

References 

Scarabaeidae genera
Deltochilini